An Algebraic decision diagram (ADD) or a Multi-terminal binary decision diagram (MTBDD), is a data structure that is used to symbolically represent a Boolean function whose codomain is an arbitrary finite set S. An ADD is an extension of a reduced ordered binary decision diagram, or commonly named binary decision diagram (BDD) in the literature, which terminal nodes are not restricted to the Boolean values 0 (FALSE) and 1 (TRUE). The terminal nodes may take any value from a set of constants S.

Definition 

An ADD is a rooted, directed, acyclic graph, which has several nodes, like a BDD. However, an ADD can have more than two terminal nodes which are elements of the set S, unlike a BDD.

Therefore, the theorems of the Boolean algebra applies to ADD, notably the Boole's expansion theorem.

Each node of is labeled by a Boolean variable and has two outgoing edges: a 1-edge which represents the evaluation of the variable to the value TRUE, and a 0-edge for its evaluation to FALSE.

An ADD employs the same reduction rules as a BDD (or Reduced Ordered BDD):

 merge any isomorphic subgraphs, and
 eliminate any node whose two children are isomorphic.
ADDs are canonical according to a particular variable ordering.

Matrix partitionning 
An ADD can be represented by a matrix according to its cofactors.

Applications 

ADDs were first implemented for sparse matrix multiplication and shortest path algorithms (Bellman-Ford, Repeated Squaring, and Floyd-Warshall procedures).

See also 

 Binary decision diagram
 Zero-suppressed decision diagram

References

Diagrams
Graph data structures